Ousmane Junior Sylla (born 30 December 1990) is a Burkinabé international footballer who plays as a midfielder for AS Aïn M'lila, on loan from CS Constantine.

Career
He has played club football for AS SONABEL, Rail Club du Kadiogo and CS Constantine. In January 2019 he moved on loan to AS Aïn M'lila.

He made his international debut for Burkina Faso in 2016.

References

1990 births
Living people
Burkinabé footballers
Burkina Faso international footballers
AS SONABEL players
Rail Club du Kadiogo players
CS Constantine players
AS Aïn M'lila players
Algerian Ligue Professionnelle 1 players
Association football midfielders
Burkinabé expatriate footballers
Burkinabé expatriate sportspeople in Algeria
Expatriate footballers in Algeria
21st-century Burkinabé people